Maximiliano Agnese, known as Mac Agnese (born April 26, 1994 in Fort Lauderdale), is a world class sailor in the Melges 24, SL16, 29er and Snipe classes.

He started sailing Optimist at age five, and won his first world championship by age 11 in the Melges 24 class. At the Youth Sailing World Championships, he won the bronze medal in the SL16 class in 2010 and the silver medal in the 29er class in 2011. In 2017 he crewed for Raúl Ríos winning the Snipe Worlds.

He attended Fort Lauderdale High School before joining the Boston College sailing team, where he was the 2011-12 team captain.

He was a member of the United States Team competing at the 2019 SailGP together with Rome Kirby, Riley Gibbs, Hans Henken and Dan Morris. Later, he joined the American Magic team that competes for the 2021 America's Cup.

References

1994 births
Living people
Boston College Eagles sailors
Snipe class sailors
Snipe class world champions
29er class sailors
Melges 24 class sailors
American Magic
American male sailors (sport)